Rivka Guber (1902–1981) was an Israeli social worker and pioneer, and a recipient of the Israel Prize.

Awards and honors
In 1976, Guber was awarded the Israel Prize, for her special contribution to society and the State of Israel, for her life’s work in education and immigrant absorption.
In 1992, the Israel Postal Authority issued a stamp in Guber's honor, bearing three portraits of her.

Published works
The Brothers, 1950
The Signal Fires of Lachish, 1961
Lakhish: A LIterary-Historical Anthology, 1965
Only a Path, 1970
These Are the Legends of Kfar Ahim, 1974
The Tradition to Bequeath, 1979

See also
List of Israel Prize recipients

References

External links 
 Rivka Guber in the Jewish Women's Archive
 Bio in honor of a stamp issued by the Israeli Postal Authority, in her name.

1902 births
1981 suicides
Israeli social workers
Israeli activists
Israeli women activists
Israeli educators
Israeli women educators
20th-century Israeli Jews
Israel Prize for special contribution to society and the State recipients
Israel Prize women recipients
Jews in Mandatory Palestine
Suicides in Israel
Soviet emigrants to Mandatory Palestine
Ukrainian Jews
1981 deaths